The United Fire Fighters of Winnipeg - Local 867 is a union in Winnipeg, Manitoba, Canada.  Its president as of December 2008 is Alex Forrest.

Political Endorsements

President Alex Forrest has lent the UFFW endorsement to a number of candidates for political office.

In the 2008 federal election, President Alex Forrest lent the UFFW endorsement to Niki Ashton in Churchill.

In the 2010 Winnipeg municipal election, President Alex Forrest lent the UFFW endorsement to mayoral candidate Sam Katz in his successful bid for re-election, against opponent Judy Wasylycia-Leis.

In the 2014 Winnipeg municipal election, President Alex Forrest lent the UFFW endorsement to mayoral candidate Judy Wasylycia-Leis in her unsuccessful run to become mayor.

In the 2015 Manitoba NDP leadership contest, President Alex Forrest first lent the UFFW endorsement to leadership candidate Steve Ashton in his unsuccessful run to become leader of the NDP. After Steve Ashton came third on the first ballot of the Manitoba NDP leadership contest and was eliminated from the leadership race, President Alex Forrest lent the UFFW endorsement to leadership candidate Greg Selinger.  In exchange for the support Greg Selinger reportedly promised to delay the implementation of self-regulation for paramedics.

In the 2015 Canadian federal election, Alex Forrest endorsed two Liberal (Dan Vandal and Terry Duguid and two NDP (Daniel Blaikie and Pat Martin) candidates in Winnipeg swing ridings.

Firefighters & Paramedics

As a result of differing priorities between Winnipeg Firefighters and Paramedics, the Paramedics Association of Manitoba has asked the Manitoba NDP to allow Winnipeg paramedics to form a self-regulating organization, a request UFFW President Alex Forrest opposes. As a result of the UFFW endorsement Alex Forrest lent to Greg Selinger during the Manitoba NDP leadership race, the MGEU sent a letter asking for clarification on the association's self-regulation bid submitted on behalf of Winnipeg Paramedics.

External links
United Fire Fighters of Winnipeg, Manitoba, Canada

References

Trade unions in Manitoba